Fear of a Black Tangent is a studio album by American rapper Busdriver. It was originally released on Mush Records in 2005. In Europe, it was released on Big Dada.

Critical reception

At Metacritic, which assigns a weighted average score out of 100 to reviews from mainstream critics, the album received an average score of 78, based on 14 reviews, indicating "generally favorable reviews".

Rollie Pemberton of Stylus Magazine gave the album a grade of B, saying: "The album is one of the few anti-industry freakouts that have appealed to me on both a conceptual and musical level, so whether or not you are familiar with Busdriver's skittering flow or innovative song structure, it's worth the time to see why he's so damn mad after all."

Track listing

Personnel
Credits adapted from liner notes.

 Busdriver – vocals
 Daedelus – production (1, 6, 11, 13)
 Omid – production (2)
 Paris Zax – production (3, 5, 7, 9, 12)
 Thavius Beck – production (4, 10)
 Subtitle – keyboards (5)
 Abstract Rude – vocals (7)
 Ellay Khule – vocals (7)
 Danger Mouse – production (8)
 Kevin McNulty – keyboards (9)
 Myka 9 – vocals (12)
 2Mex – vocals (12)
 Isaac Sprintis – guitar (12)

References

Further reading

External links
 

2005 albums
Busdriver albums
Mush Records albums
Big Dada albums
Albums produced by Danger Mouse (musician)
Albums produced by Thavius Beck